Look Both Ways: A Tale Told in Ten Blocks is a young adult novel written by Jason Reynolds, illustrated by Alexander Nabaum, and published October 8, 2019 by Atheneum Books. The book is a New York Times best seller, National Book Award for Young People's Literature finalist (2019), Coretta Scott King Award honor book (2020), and Carnegie Medal recipient (2021).

Reception 
Look Both Ways is a New York Times best seller.

The book received starred reviews from Publishers Weekly, School Library Journal, Booklist, Horn Book, and Kirkus, as well as a positive review from Shelf Awareness.

Booklist's Ronny Khuri referred to the book as "storytelling at its finest, a true masterpiece."

Kirkus Reviews noted, "The entire collection brims with humor, pathos, and the heroic struggle to grow up." Publishers Weekly agreed with the sentiment, stating that "each story rings with emotional authenticity and empathy, and not a small amount of rib-tickling humor offsets the sometimes bittersweet realities of the characters’ lives."

Kyla Paterno of Shelf Awareness called the book "an unconventional, clever exploration of the secret trials and tribulations of middle schoolers," noting that the "connected and intertwining tales are not neatly contained nor completed at the end, but rather left ambiguous, allowing readers to decide what happens next."

The audiobook, narrated by Heather Alicia Simms, Bahni Turpin, and January LaVoy and others, received a starred review from Booklist, who noted, [T]he readers reflect [the characters'] bravado and ethnicity. They also give them vulnerability and surprising grit as they face everyday problems."

"Each of Reynolds's characters is so highly developed and memorable that they are easily noticed as background players in the others' vignettes. " Shelf Awareness

Look Both Ways was named one of the best children's books of the year by Kirkus Reviews, NPR, Chicago Public Library, The New York Times, TIME, The Today Show, the Center for the Study of Multicultural Children's Literature, School Library Journal, and Publishers Weekly.

Accolades

References 

2020 American novels
2020 children's books
American children's novels
Atheneum Books books
Carnegie Medal in Literature winning works
Books by Jason Reynolds